Skewen railway station serves the village of Skewen, south Wales. It is a stop on the South Wales Main Line, served by Transport for Wales Swanline regional trains between Swansea and Cardiff, which typically run every two hours. There is no Sunday service.

Facilities
The station has 2 platforms:
Platform 1, for westbound trains towards Swansea
Platform 2, for eastbound trains towards Cardiff Central

The station is unmanned; there is no ticket office or platform barrier. Passengers must buy their tickets from the conductor on the train.  Amenities provided include waiting shelters, customer help points, digital CIS displays and timetable poster boards.  Step-free access is available on both platforms via ramps from the car park and road above.

History
The first station here was opened in 1882 by the Great Western Railway as Dynevor and renamed in 1904. It was resited a little to the east in 1910 and closed by the Western Region of British Railways in 1964. The present station was opened to the west as part of the Swanline initiative in 1994.

Services
The typical service pattern is one train approximately every two hours in each direction, with some peak period extras.

No trains stop here on Sundays. A normal weekday service operates on most bank holidays.

References

External links

Railway stations in Neath Port Talbot
DfT Category F2 stations
Former Great Western Railway stations
Railway stations in Great Britain opened in 1882
Railway stations in Great Britain closed in 1910
Railway stations in Great Britain opened in 1910
Railway stations in Great Britain closed in 1964
Railway stations in Great Britain opened in 1994
Reopened railway stations in Great Britain
South Wales Main Line
Railway stations served by Transport for Wales Rail
Beeching closures in Wales